Guaycura, Guaycuri, Waicura, or other variants, may refer to:

 Guaycura people, a former ethnic group of Mexico
 Guaycura language, an extinct language of Mexico

See also 
 Guaycuru peoples, a group of people of South America
 Guaicuruan languages, or Waikurúan, a language family of South America